Piz Bianco (also known as Piz Alv) is a minor summit north of Piz Bernina, in the Bernina Range of the Alps. It is located south of Pontresina in the canton of Graubünden.

Culminating at 3,995 metres, Piz Bianco is the highest point of the snowy ridge named Biancograt (or Crast'Alva). The summit is often traversed by climbers on the way to Piz Bernina.

References

External links
 Piz Bianco on Hikr

Mountains of the Alps
Alpine three-thousanders
Mountains of Switzerland
Mountains of Graubünden
Bernina Range
Pontresina